Tenneco (formerly Tenneco Automotive and originally Tennessee Gas Transmission Company) is an American automotive components original equipment manufacturer and an aftermarket ride control and emissions products manufacturer. It is a Fortune 500 company that has been publicly traded on the New York Stock Exchange since November 5, 1999 under the symbol TEN. Tenneco company headquarters are located in Lake Forest, Illinois, United States

The company was acquired in November 2022 by Apollo Global Management.

History
Tenneco, Inc.'s origin was in the Chicago Corporation, established about 1930.  Tennessee Gas and Transmission Company (completely separate) had been formed  in 1940.

Natural gas
A shortage of fuel for World War II defense industries in the Appalachian area developed when industrial production was increased. The nuclear development operations of the Manhattan Project at Oak Ridge, Tennessee consumed huge quantities of Tennessee Valley Authority electrical power that would have otherwise been available to other industrial operations. The Chicago Corporation was able to acquire a Federal Power Commission (FPC) license to build a pipeline from Texas to Appalachia, eventually expanding to the largest natural gas pipeline network in the United States. These pipelines were acquired by El Paso Corporation in 1996, and are now owned by Kinder Morgan.

Diversification
In the 1950s, the company acquired existing oil companies, including Sterling Oil, Del-Key Petroleum, and Bay Petroleum. The Tennessee division of the Chicago Corporation acquired Tennessee Gas Transmission Company in 1943 to build a natural-gas pipeline  from Texas to West Virginia. The first line was completed in October 1944. It was followed by three additional pipelines totaling  during the next 15 years which provide gas to New York and New Jersey.

In 1966, Tennessee Gas was incorporated as Tenneco, Inc. Tenneco expanded into a number of business ventures as a result of diversification. In 1967, the company acquired Walker, Inc., a manufacturer of universal-fit exhaust mufflers and pipes. The year after, they started working on the construction of a universal-fit catalytic converter, that would become a cost-effective alternative to the OE catalytic converters. It took the company 8 years to introduce one. Tenneco bought Houston Oil & Minerals Corporation in the late 1970s. Tenneco owned and operated a large number of gasoline service stations, but all were closed or replaced with other brands by the mid-1990s.

In the 1970s, Tenneco purchased 53% of J.I. Case when they purchased its owner Kern County Land Company, the agricultural equipment manufacturer based in Racine, Wisconsin, USA.  In 1972, Tenneco purchased UK-based David Brown Tractors, and merged it with the J.I. Case business. In 1984, Case parent Tenneco bought selected assets of the International Harvester agriculture division and merged it with J.I. Case. All agriculture products are first labeled Case International and later Case IH. Tenneco purchased the articulated 4WD manufacturer Steiger Tractor in 1986, and merged it into Case IH.

The new corporate direction was to buy failing companies in a variety of industries, and work to develop them into market leaders. This worked well with Newport News Shipbuilding, but failed miserably with the various tractor companies, probably due in large part to the economy at the time. By 1988, the company was losing $2 million per day. After being pressured by the banks, it was decided to sell off the oil business. Tenneco Oil Exploration Company was split up and sold off to multiple buyers.

By 1994, Tenneco decided to begin getting out of the agricultural business and agreed to sell 35% of the now named Case Corporation. In 1996, the spin-off of Case Corporation was completed. The company was acquired by Fiat in 1999 and merged with New Holland Agriculture to form CNH Global.

Consolidation
Tenneco Inc. emerged from a conglomerate consisting of six unrelated businesses: shipbuilding, packaging, farm and construction equipment, gas transmission, automotive, and chemicals. The automotive division was spun off from Tenneco, Inc. in 1991 along with the packaging, energy, natural gas, and shipbuilding divisions.  All businesses except automotive and packaging were disposed of between 1994 and 1996 (through public offerings, sales, spin-offs and mergers). In 1999, Tenneco Packaging was spun off and renamed to Packaging Corporation of America (Pactiv Corporation).

Since the 1960s, Tenneco Automotive has sold mufflers (UK: silencers) in Europe, including through the Pit Stop chain in Germany. The group bought a German factory in Virnheim in 1969, Swedish Starla in 1974 and French Bellanger and English Harmo Industries in 1976 and Danish Lydex in 1978. More acquisitions followed.

On October 28, 2005 Tenneco Automotive was renamed as Tenneco.

Federal Mogul Acquisition

On October 1, 2018, Tenneco completed its acquisition of Federal-Mogul, a leading global supplier to original equipment manufacturers and the aftermarket.

In February 2019, it was announced that Tenneco will be separated into two different companies, leading to the launch of DRiV Incorporated - a publicly traded Aftermarket and Ride Performance company that will serve as a global multi-line and multi-brand aftermarket supplier of ride performance and braking suppliers to light vehicle and commercial vehicle customers.

Acquisition by Apollo Global Management
On February 23, 2022, Tenneco announced that it had entered into a definitive agreement to be acquired by Apollo Global Management for $7.1 billion. The acquisition was completed in November 2022.

Operations
Tenneco is a multi-national corporation with 93 manufacturing facilities in 26 countries located on 6 continents, with major centers of operations in North America, Europe, Australia and Asia. There were 30,000 employees in 2016. The North American manufacturing facilities are located in Arkansas, Illinois, Indiana, Michigan, Missouri, Nebraska, Tennessee, Georgia, Virginia, Ohio and Cambridge, Ontario, Canada; the corporate headquarters is located in Lake Forest, Illinois, European facilities in Belgium, Poland, Czech Republic, Germany, UK, France, Spain and Portugal, with headquarters located in Belgium, Asian facilities include in India, China, Singapore and Japan, Australian Facilities are in Sydney, Morea (New Zealand) and Clovelly Park and African Facility includes South Africa's Port Elizabeth.

Tenneco owns the following brands:
 Axios
 Clevite Elastomers
 DNX
 DynoMax
 Fonos
 Fric-Rot
 Gillet
 Kinetic
 Lukey
 Marzocchi
 Monroe
 Öhlins
 Rancho
 Walker
 Thrush

These are sold to over 500 after-market customers including retailers and wholesalers and to more than 25 OEMs, including Audi, Chrysler, Daimler, Stellantis,Enfield, Fiat, Ford Motor Company, General Motors, Honda, Navistar International, Jaguar Cars, Mahindra & Mahindra, Maruti Suzuki, Mazda, Mitsubishi, Nissan, Porsche, PSA Peugeot Citroën, Renault, Škoda, Suzuki, Tata, Toyota, TVS, Volkswagen Group, Volvo, E-Z-GO, and CLUB CAR.

Controversy
During the 2022 Russian invasion of Ukraine, reports surfaced that Tenneco had failed to join other "international" (mainly western) businesses by withdrawing from the Russian market. Research from Yale University updated on April 28, 2022, identifying how companies were reacting to Russia's invasion identified Tenneco in the worst category of "Digging In", meaning Defying Demands for Exit: companies defying demands for exit/reduction of activities.

Locations

United States

Arkansas
 Paragould - Products: Shock absorbers, struts

Georgia
 Hartwell - Products: shock absorbers

Indiana
 Angola - Elastomeric Products: Heavy duty/Automotive products, spring eye bushings, fluid bushings, torque rod assemblies, links, & V-rods.
 Elkhart - Manufacturing plant that primarily makes exhaust components for other Tenneco facilities. The Elkhart plant is the only manufacturing plant that is owned (rather than leased) by Tenneco.
 Ligonier - Manufacturing facility that makes full exhaust systems and related components for Ford Motor Company, Chrysler, and Honda. Ligonier is one of the plants that has its own tubemill which accepts steel coil, gradually rolls it into a pipe and then welds the seam shut. This newly formed pipe is then cut to length and used within the plant or shipped as-is to other Tenneco plants.

Michigan
 Litchfield - Manufacturing facility that makes full exhaust systems and related components. This plant has its own tubemill which accepts steel coil, gradually rolls it into a tube and welds the seam shut. This newly formed pipe is cut to length and used within the plant or shipped as-is to other Tenneco plants.
 Marshall - Manufacturing facility that makes full exhaust systems and related components for Ford Motor Company, Chrysler, and General Motors. Marshall is one of the plants that has its own tubemill which accepts steel coil, gradually rolls it into a tube and then welds the seam shut. This newly formed pipe is cut to length and used within the plant or shipped as-is to other Tenneco plants. The Marshall facility is also equipped with multiple high-speed automatic muffler assembly lines.
 Monroe - Houses the North American business unit which consists of almost 500 employees involved in multiple disciplines such as design, product engineering, sales, and marketing.

Missouri
 Kansas City - Manufacturing facility that makes full exhaust systems and related components for Ford and General Motors.

Nebraska
 Seward - Manufacturing facility that makes full exhaust systems and related components for CAT, Chrysler, General Motors, John Deere and Harley-Davidson. Seward is one of the plants that has its own tubemill which accepts steel coil, gradually rolls it into a tube and then welds the seam shut. This newly formed pipe is cut to length and used within the plant or shipped as-is to other Tenneco plants.

Ohio
 Kettering - Products: Shock absorbers, Struts, modular suspension assemblies, XNOx injector, and XNOx DCU box.
 Milan - Products: suspension bushings, cab mounts, steering system bushings, exhaust isolators, rubber compound
 Napoleon - Products: anti-vibration bushings and suspension links

Tennessee
 Smithville - Products: Automotive parts

Virginia
 Harrisonburg - Aftermarket exhaust

International
Argentina
 Rosario - Monroe Fric Rot - Shock absorbers
 Buenos Aires - Walker - Products: Muffler (silencers), Catalysts, exhaust systems

Australia
 Edinburgh Park, Adelaide - Products: exhaust systems
 Monroe, Clovelly Park, Adelaide - Products: shock absorbers, struts
 Walker, O'Sullivan Beach, Adelaide - Products: emission control
 Monroe Springs, Sydney - Products: coil and leaf springs

Belgium
 Sint-Truiden - EU headquarters Ride Control division; METC, the EU design and development center; largest ride control plant in Europe; products: shock absorbers, powdered metal components, press parts

Brazil
 Cotia, São Paulo (Axios) - Products: engine mounts, shock absorber bushings, and dampers
 Moji-Mirim, São Paulo (Monroe, Walker) - Products: exhaust automotive systems and shock absorbers
 Três Corações, Minas Gerais (Federal-Mogul) - Products: combustion engine valves
 Santo André, São Paulo (Federal-Mogul) - Products: combustion engine valves
 Araras, São Paulo (Federal-Mogul) - Products: pistons and camshafts
 Manaus, Amazonas (Federal-Mogul) - Products: lighting equipments
 São Bernardo do Campo, São Paulo - Former Diadema plant. Passthrough operations.

Canada
 Cambridge, Ontario - Exhaust systems and components
 Owen Sound, Ontario - Shocks and shock absorbers under the label Monroe

China
 Suzhou - Products: elastomer products

Czech Republic
 Hodkovice nad Mohelkou - Products: shock absorber and exhaust systems

Germany
 Edenkoben - Products: exhaust systems

Hungary
 Kecskemét - Products: Exhaust systems

India
 Bawal - Products: struts, shock absorbers, front fork
 Pune - Products: muffler (silencers), catalytic converter, complete exhaust systems
 Hosur - Products: struts, shock absorbers, front fork
 Sanand - Products: Exhaust System (Silencers)

Mexico
 Aguascalientes, Aguascalientes - Exhaust Systems
 Celaya, Guanajuato - Shock absorber (struts)
 Puebla, Puebla - Exhaust Systems
 Reynosa, Tamaulipas - Products: bushing silentbloc, bonded products, Clevebloc products, STA Bars, control arm links, engine mounts

Poland
 Rybnik - Emission control engineering and manufacturing
 Gliwice - Shock absorber (struts) plant with Engineering Centre (EEEC) in Gliwice, near Katowice
 Stanowice

Portugal
 Palmela - Products: Exhaust systems (JIT Plant) VW Autoeuropa.

Spain
 Ermua - Products: shock absorbers, elastomers, and complete exhaust systems
 Gijón - Products: shock absorbers - closed in 2016.
 Valencia

South Africa
Port Elizabeth - producing Shock Absorbers under the Monroe brand

Wales
Tredegar - producing exhaust systems under the Tenneco-Walker brand, employing 190
Dowlais Top - producing exhaust components, scheduled to employ 200+

See also

 Pine Mountain Club, California, a Tenneco West residential development

References

External links

 

2022 mergers and acquisitions
Natural gas companies of the United States
Natural gas pipeline companies
Auto parts suppliers of the United States
Manufacturing companies based in Illinois
Multinational companies headquartered in the United States
Companies based in Lake Forest, Illinois
American companies established in 1940
Energy companies established in 1940
Conglomerate companies established in 1940
Manufacturing companies established in 1940
Non-renewable resource companies established in 1940
1940 establishments in Illinois
Companies listed on the New York Stock Exchange